Compsoneura is a genus comprising 23 species of trees found in tropical lowland forests of the New World. It can be distinguished from other Neotropical Myristicaceae by its conspicuous parallel tertiary venation that is nearly perpendicular to the costa.

References 

Myristicaceae
Myristicaceae genera